Bath and North East Somerset Council is the local authority for the unitary authority of Bath and North East Somerset, England. The council is elected every four years by the first past the post system of election and currently consists of 59 councillors, representing 33 electoral wards. The Liberal Democrats are currently the largest party on the council, having gained majority control in the 2019 local elections. The council meets at The Guildhall in Bath.

Following the recommendations of the Local Government Commission for England the unitary authority replaced Bath City Council, Wansdyke District Council and Avon County Council. The first elections to the new authority were in May 1995, and the council took office on 1 April 1996.

Political control
Since the first election to the council in 1995 political control of the council has been held by the following parties:

Leadership
The leaders of the council since 2002 have been:

Council elections
1995 Bath and North East Somerset Council election
1999 Bath and North East Somerset Council election (New ward boundaries)
2003 Bath and North East Somerset Council election
2007 Bath and North East Somerset Council election
2011 Bath and North East Somerset Council election
2015 Bath and North East Somerset Council election
2019 Bath and North East Somerset Council election (New ward boundaries reduced the number of seats by 6)

The number of councillors by party was:

District result maps

By-election results
By-elections occur when seats become vacant between council elections. Below is a summary of all by-elections; full by-election results can be found by clicking on the by-election name.

References

External links
Bath and North East Somerset Council

 
Council elections in Somerset
Politics of Bath, Somerset
Local elections
Unitary authority elections in England